Nebria attemsi is a species of ground beetle in the Nebriinae subfamily that can be found in such countries as Albania, and all states of former Yugoslavia, except for Croatia, Slovenia, and Bosnia and Herzegovina.

References

attemsi
Beetles described in 1908
Beetles of Europe